Season twelve of the television program American Experience originally aired on the PBS network in the United States on November 14, 1999, and concluded on May 22, 2000. This is the last season to feature David McCullough as the host, he had been with them since the show's debut in 1988. The season contained 15 new episodes and began with the first part of the miniseries New York: A Documentary Film, "The Country and the City".

Episodes

References

1999 American television seasons
2000 American television seasons
American Experience